Brécy is a commune in the Cher department in the Centre-Val de Loire region of France.

Geography
The commune lies on the pilgrimage route known as the Way of St. James.

Population

Sights
 The church of St. Germain, dating from the twelfth century.
 The twelfth century chapel at Francheville, originally a Knights Templar commandry.
 Several ancient buildings at the hamlets of Guilly and Francheville.

See also
Communes of the Cher department

References

Communes of Cher (department)